Mīrān is a town in Maidan Wardak Province, central Afghanistan. It is the administrative center of Day Mirdad District.

The town of Miran has a population of 2,760.

Geography
Miran is located about 2,812 m above sea level.

Climate
Miran has a warm-summer humid continental climate (Köppen climate classification: Dsb) with warm, dry summers and cold winters.

The warmest month in Miran is July, averaging 16 °C (60.8 °F). The coldest temperatures usually occur in December, January and February, when daily mean temperatures range from -4 to -6 °C (24 - 20 °F) throughout the day.

Demographics
A majority of the population are Pashtuns and Hazaras. Pashto in Wardag accent, as well as Hazaragi language are spoken in the town.

References

Populated places in Maidan Wardak Province